The Theodore Dean House is a historic house located at 26 Dean Street in Taunton, Massachusetts.  The -story Italianate style frame house features a central gable pavilion and a front porch carried on chamfered posts.   It was built in 1866 for Theodore Dean, who was the last owner of the Taunton Iron Works and president of the Eagle Cotton Mill, and president of a local bank.  Dean's family had a long history in the community, establishing the iron works in the 17th century.

The house was added to the National Register of Historic Places in 1984.

See also
National Register of Historic Places listings in Taunton, Massachusetts

References

National Register of Historic Places in Taunton, Massachusetts
Houses in Taunton, Massachusetts
Houses on the National Register of Historic Places in Bristol County, Massachusetts